Muhammad Arif Shah Jahan is a politician and the former governor of Maidan Wardak province and Farah province in Afghanistan. He was appointed as governor of Wardak province by President Ashraf Ghani in place of Zundi Gul Zamani on 17 February 2018. He was previously the representative of the people of Ghazni province in Afghanistan Parliament.

Early life 
Muhammad Arif Shah Jahan was born in 1954 in Jaghatū District of Ghazni province, Afghanistan. He belongs to the ethnic Hazara.

See also 
 List of governors of Wardak
Governor of Farah
Governor of Wardak
DEPUTY OF NDS
Leader of trust Front of Afghanistan.

Notes 

Living people
1954 births
Hazara politicians
Governors of Maidan Wardak Province
Governors of Farah Province
People from Ghazni Province